The Marauder is an armoured, mine-protected vehicle that is produced by Paramount Group in South Africa. It was launched during the 2007 International Defence Exhibition (IDEX) and Conference in Abu Dhabi, the largest arms exhibition in the Middle East.

Design and specifications
The Marauder was developed for reconnaissance and peacekeeping missions. It carries a crew of up to ten including the driver and commander.

Designed to operate in urban, built-up, and confined areas, it is smaller in size and weight than the Matador, a similarly armored vehicle. Vehicle configuration is either 4x4 or a 6x6.

The Marauder double monocoque hull provides protection against projectiles up to STANAG 4569 Level III for the crew compartment.

The Marauder payload capacity allows for the fitting of various defense and weapons systems, including light and medium-caliber machine guns, cannon weapon installations, and missile launchers, as well as command-surveillance-control systems. The vehicle can be configured so mortars may be fired from the payload platform.

Production

Russia
In 2022 the Marauder has been spotted in Mariupol during the Russo-Ukrainian War.

Jordan
In 2008, for the manufacturing and production of the Marauder, the Paramount Group entered into an agreement with the King Abdullah Design and Development Bureau (KADDB), Jordan's primary governmental military agency that develops and manufactures defence systems, and which serves as an independent technical advisor to the Jordanian Armed Forces (JAF). As well as being a manufacturer, Jordan was the first customer for the Marauder.

Azerbaijan
The Marauder is also manufactured in Azerbaijan by the Ministry of Defence Industry of Azerbaijan through a joint agreement with Paramount.

Kazakhstan
Kazakhstan Engineering makes the Marauder under licence as the Arlan under the joint-venture Kazakhstan Paramount Engineering after their announcement in 2018. In the same year, they announced 70% of their radios and remote-control weapon-stations were local-made.

Near Astana, construction of the factory started in 2014, and was complete a year later.

Singapore
The Marauder is manufactured in Singapore by ST Engineering in collaboration with Paramount and the Defence Science and Technology Agency. This was based on a 2012 agreement with Paramount to work together in manufacturing and marketing the vehicle.

The variants made under the Belrex label consist of  security, engineer, reconnaissance, logistics, fuel, medical, signal, maintenance, and ammunition & mortar carrier. The base platform comes in three basic crew compartment sizes: four, eight and ten.

Operators

: According to SIPRI, only 2 were delivered in 2009 + negotiations to buy the Arlan from Kazakhstan.
: Over 100 delivered in total between 2009 and 2014. Local production of the vehicles was established under an agreement between the Paramount Group and the Ministry of Defence Industry of Azerbaijan.
: 52 delivered in total between 2010 and 2012.
: An initial batch of ~50 Marauders and Matadors were ordered in March 2008. Local production of the vehicles was established under an agreement between the Paramount Group and the King Abdullah II Design and Development Bureau.
: An unknown number of a new winterized variant, called Arlan (Wolf), were ordered in 2013 and delivery is scheduled to take place in 2016. Local production of the Arlan by Kazakhstan Paramount Engineering (KPE), a joint venture company under an agreement between Paramount Group and state-owned Kazakhstan Engineering. The first Arlans were delivered to Kazakh special forces in December 2017.
: 6 ordered in 2013
: 5 ordered in 2020
: Unknown number acquired for the Nigerian Air Force in March 2019, modified with Jordanian "snake head" turret.
: 1 ordered in 2013
: In service with the Kadyrovites.
: Designation as Belrex Protected Combat Support Vehicle, operates a custom-built variant with extended wheelbase. 122 ordered in 2013. Officially brought into service in 2016. The Belrexes will replace all unarmored five-ton trucks in service with the SAF.
: 3 delivered in 2016 for the Zambia Police Service.

References

External links

 Manufacturer Spec page with Downloads 

Armoured fighting vehicles of the post–Cold War period
Armoured personnel carriers of South Africa
Military equipment of Azerbaijan
Military light utility vehicles
Military vehicles introduced in the 2000s
Armoured personnel carriers of the post–Cold War period
Wheeled armoured personnel carriers